Anshan Sports Centre Stadium is a multi-purpose stadium in Anshan, China.  It is currently used mostly for football matches.  The stadium holds 40,000 people.

References

Football venues in China
Multi-purpose stadiums in China